Clare "Blossom" Elfman ( Bernstein; November 4, 1925 – April 10, 2017) was an American novelist.

Biography
Clare (nickname, "Blossom") Bernstein was born November 4, 1925. Writing as Clare Elfman, she was senior literary editor of Buzzine (owned and operated by her son, Richard Elfman). She also wrote theater and book reviews and did interviews.

Her husband was Milton Elfman (1915–2001); they were married for 53 years until his death in 2001. She had two children: writer, director and publisher Richard Elfman, and musician, composer, actor, and voice actor Danny Elfman. Their family is Jewish.

Adaptations of Elfman novels The Girls of Huntington House was produced as a film and I Think I'm Having a Baby received an Emmy as a television movie.

Bibliography
The Girls of Huntington House (1972)
A House for Jonnie O. (1977)
The Sister Act (1979)
The Butterfly Girl (1980)
Return of Whistler (1982)
I Think I'm Having a Baby (1982)
The Strawberry Fields of Heaven (1983)
The Haunted Heart (1987)
Love Me Deadly (1989)
Tell Me No Lies (Mike and Ally Mystery, No 2) (1989)
The Ghost-Sitter (Mike and Ally Mystery, No 3) (1990)
The Curse of the Dancing Doll (Mike and Ally Mystery) (1991)
The Case of the Pederast's Wife (2005)

Film
The Girls of Huntington House (1973)
CBS Afternoon Playhouse: I think I'm Having a Baby (1981)

Awards
The Girls of Huntington House, winner, the "ALA Best Book for Young Adults Award", 1972
A House for Jonnie O., winner, the ALA Best Book for Young Adults Award, 1977
CBS Afternoon Playhouse: I think I'm Having a Baby, winner, a Daytime Emmy Award for "Outstanding Individual Achievement in Children's Programming"

References

1925 births
2017 deaths
20th-century American novelists
21st-century American novelists
American women novelists
Writers from New York City
Elfman family
Jewish American writers
Novelists from New York (state)
21st-century American women writers